Ben Thomas Moss Jr. is a Republican member of the North Carolina House of Representatives who has represented the 52nd district (including all of Richmond County, as well as part of Moore County) and its predecessors since 2021. He defeated incumbent Democrat Scott Brewer in the 2020 election. A railroad engineer from Rockingham, North Carolina, he previously served on the Richmond County board of commissioners from 2010 to 2020.

Committee assignments

2021-2022 session
Appropriations
Appropriations - Transportation
Transportation (Vice Chair)
Local Government (Vice Chair)
Commerce

Electoral history

2022

2020

References

|-

Living people
Clayton State University alumni
People from Rockingham, North Carolina
Year of birth missing (living people)
County commissioners in North Carolina
Republican Party members of the North Carolina House of Representatives
21st-century American politicians